FC Real Pharma Odesa  is a professional Ukrainian football club from the city of Odesa. The "Pharma" portion of the name comes from pharmaceutical influences that are associated with the club's ownership as evident on the original logo which is in English rather than Ukrainian.

The team is currently playing Ukrainian Second League after competing in the Ukrainian Amateur championship. The club was formed in 2000.

History

The team was founded in 2000 as Limed Pokrovske and until 2011 played in Odesa. Since 2005 the club was known as Real-Pharm. In 2010 the club was passed onto Mykola Lykhovydov who became the club's president and playing manager. Until 2011 the club participated in football competitions of Odesa Oblast. In March of 2011 Real Pharm was registered as a professional club and lost the hyphen in its name. It also joined competitions of the national amateur league, the early stages of the 2011 season.

"Real Pharm" debut in the Ukrainian Second League in the 2011–12 season.

In 2013, the club moved their operations from Yuzhne to Ovidiopol and prior to the 2013–14 Ukrainian Second League season renamed the team to Real Pharma Ovidiopol.

The club moved their operations to Odesa prior to the start of the 2015–16 season.

Home stadiums
 2011–2013 Spartak Stadium, Odesa
 2013–2015 Dukov Dnister Stadium, Ovidiopol
 2015–2016 Ivan Stadium, Odesa
 2016– present Spartak Stadium, Odesa

Emblems

Players

League and cup history

{|class="wikitable"
|-bgcolor="#efefef"
! Season
! Div.
! Pos.
! Pl.
! W
! D
! L
! GS
! GA
! P
!Domestic Cup
!colspan=2|Europe
!Notes
|-bgcolor=SteelBlue
|align=center|2011
|align=center|4th
|align=center|2
|align=center|10
|align=center|7
|align=center|1
|align=center|2
|align=center|21
|align=center|11
|align=center|22
|align=center|
|align=center|
|align=center|
|align=center|withdrew
|-bgcolor=PowderBlue
|align=center|2011–12
|align=center|3rd "A"
|align=center|7
|align=center|26
|align=center|9
|align=center|6
|align=center|11
|align=center|28
|align=center|41
|align=center|33
|align=center|1/64 finals
|align=center|
|align=center|
|align=center|
|-bgcolor=PowderBlue
|align=center rowspan="2"|2012–13
|align=center|3rd "A"
|align=center|6
|align=center|20 	
|align=center|8 	
|align=center|6 	
|align=center|6 	
|align=center|23 	
|align=center|25 	
|align=center|30
|align=center rowspan="2"|1/64 finals
|align=center|
|align=center|
|align=center|
|-bgcolor=PowderBlue
|align=center|3rd "1"
|align=center|6
|align=center|10 	
|align=center|1 	
|align=center|3 	
|align=center|6 	
|align=center|12 	
|align=center|24
|align=center|6
|align=center|
|align=center|
|align=center|Stage 2
|-bgcolor=PowderBlue
|align=center|2013–14
|align=center|3rd 
|align=center|12
|align=center|35
|align=center|13
|align=center|5
|align=center|17
|align=center|27
|align=center|57
|align=center|44
|align=center|1/32 finals
|align=center|
|align=center|
|align=center|
|-bgcolor=PowderBlue
|align=center|2014–15
|align=center|3rd 
|align=center|4
|align=center|27
|align=center|11 	
|align=center|9 	
|align=center|7 	
|align=center|40 	
|align=center|29
|align=center|42
|align=center|1/16 finals
|align=center|
|align=center|
|align=center|
|-bgcolor=PowderBlue
|align=center|2015–16
|align=center|3rd 
|align=center|7
|align=center| 	26 	
|align=center|12 	
|align=center|5 	
|align=center|	9 	
|align=center|31 	
|align=center|29 	
|align=center|41
|align=center|1/32 finals
|align=center|
|align=center|
|align=center|
|-bgcolor=PowderBlue
|align=center|2016–17
|align=center|3rd
|align=center|5
|align=center|32 	
|align=center|16 	
|align=center|9 	
|align=center|7 	
|align=center|50 	
|align=center|31 	
|align=center|57
|align=center|1/16 finals
|align=center|
|align=center|
|align=center|
|-bgcolor=PowderBlue
|align=center|2017–18
|align=center|3rd
|align=center|6
|align=center|33  
|align=center|15  	
|align=center|7	
|align=center|11  
|align=center|54  	 	
|align=center|40
|align=center|52
|align=center|1/64 finals
|align=center|
|align=center|
|align=center| 
|-bgcolor=PowderBlue
|align=center|2018–19
|align=center|3rd
|align=center|8
|align=center|	27 	
|align=center|	5 	
|align=center|	8 	
|align=center|14 	
|align=center|	23 	
|align=center|	50 	 		 	 	
|align=center|23
|align=center|1/64 finals
|align=center|
|align=center|
|align=center|
|-bgcolor=PowderBlue
|align=center|2019–20
|align=center|3rd
|align=center|
|align=center|	
|align=center|	 	
|align=center|		
|align=center|
|align=center|	 	 	
|align=center|	
|align=center|
|align=center|1/64 finals
|align=center|
|align=center|
|align=center|
|}

Former coaches
 2000-2000 Mykola Lykhovydov
 2001–2003 Mykola Lykhovydov & Serhiy Irichenko
 2004–2005 Vasyl Mokan
 2006-2006 Mykola Lykhovydov
 2006–2008 Oleksandr Bondarenko
 2009–2012 Mykola Lykhovydov
 2013–2014 Ihor Korniyets
 2014–2016 Vladyslav Zubkov
 2016–2017 Oleksandr Bondarenko (acting)
 2017–2019 Andriy Kovalenko
 2019–2020 Oleksandr Spitsyn
 2020– Artem Riazantsev

References

External links
 Official website

 
Ukrainian Second League clubs
Football clubs in Odesa
2010 establishments in Ukraine
Association football clubs established in 2010
Sport in Ovidiopol
Sport in Yuzhne